Poland competed at the 2006 Winter Olympics in Turin, Italy.

Poland sent 45 athletes to the 2006 Winter Olympic Games, and snowboarder Paulina Ligocka was the flag bearer at the opening ceremonies, while biathlete Tomasz Sikora was the flag bearer at the closing ceremonies.

Medalists

Alpine skiing 

Note: In the men's combined, run 1 is the downhill, and runs 2 and 3 are the slalom. In the women's combined, run 1 and 2 are the slalom, and run 3 the downhill.

Biathlon 

Men

Women

Bobsleigh

Cross-country skiing 

Distance

Sprint

Figure skating 

Key: CD = Compulsory Dance, FD = Free Dance, FS = Free Skate, OD = Original Dance, SP = Short Program

Luge

Short track speed skating

Skeleton

Ski jumping 

Note: PQ indicates a skier was pre-qualified for the final, based on entry rankings.

Snowboarding 

Halfpipe

Note: In the final, the single best score from two runs is used to determine the ranking. A bracketed score indicates a run that wasn't counted.

Parallel GS

Key: '+ Time' represents a deficit; the brackets indicate the results of each run.

Snowboard Cross

Speed skating

References

Nations at the 2006 Winter Olympics
2006
2006 in Polish sport